Yulyana Yushchanka (née , Zhalniaruk; born 14 August 1984) is a Belarusian sprinter who specializes in the 400 metres.

In 2006 Zhalniaruk won a bronze medal in the 4 x 400 metres relay at the World Indoor Championships (with teammates Natallia Solohub, Anna Kozak and Ilona Usovich). She also won a silver medal at the European Championships (with Sviatlana Usovich, Kozak and I. Usovich).

Her personal best for the 400 metres is 51.01 seconds, achieved in August 2007 in Minsk.

External links

1984 births
Living people
Belarusian female sprinters
European Athletics Championships medalists
World Athletics Indoor Championships medalists